The 1940 Drake Bulldogs football team was an American football represented Drake University in the Missouri Valley Conference (MVC) during the 1940 college football season. In its eighth season under head coach Vee Green, the team compiled a 4–5 record (2–2 against MVC opponents), tied for third place in the MVC, and outscored opponents by a total of 125 to 108.

Schedule

References

Drake
Drake Bulldogs football seasons
Drake Bulldogs football